Geneseo is the name of several places in the United States:

Genesee, California, formerly Geneseo
Geneseo, New York
Geneseo (village), New York
State University of New York at Geneseo
Geneseo, Illinois
Geneseo, Kansas
Geneseo, North Dakota, in Sargent County, North Dakota

See also
Genesee (disambiguation)